Saturday's Warrior is a religious-themed musical written by Douglass Stewart and Lex de Azevedo about a family who are members of the Church of Jesus Christ of Latter-day Saints (LDS Church). The musical tells the story of a group of children that are born into a Latter-day Saint family after making various promises in the premortal life. Two of the children, Jimmy and Julie, encounter personal struggles that help them rediscover and fulfill their foreordained missions in life. Although no explicit time frame is given in the dialogue, certain contextual clues (in particular, a song that references the Zero population growth movement) suggest that the story takes place in the then-current and then-recent period of the late 1960s or early '70s, similar to other religious musicals such as Godspell and Jesus Christ Superstar.

The musical explores the Latter-day Saint doctrines and views on the plan of salvation, premortal life, foreordination, and eternal marriage. It depicts abortion and birth control as being contrary to the divine plan of salvation.

Saturday's Warrior was first performed in California in 1973 as a college project. In early spring 1974, the play was performed at Brigham Young University's (BYU) Spring Arts Festival by a cast of BYU students.  Bob Williams made a video version of the musical in 1989, setting it on a stage as opposed to giving the movie a more naturalistic look. It is among the first popular LDS films to not be made or sponsored by the LDS Church or BYU. Stewart wrote two sequels, Star Child (music by Gaye Beeson) which debuted in 1981, and The White Star (music by Janice Kapp Perry) which debuted in 2007. In 2016, de Azevedo and Stewart produced another filmed remake with a more naturalized look.

Plot
While waiting in the pre-mortal Life to be born, a family of eight children promise each other that they will always be there for each other ("Pullin' Together"). The youngest, Emily, is afraid that when her turn to be born comes around, their parents will be tired of having kids, and she won't be born into their family. The oldest, Jimmy, promises Emily he will personally see to it she will be born into their family. Julie—the second-oldest daughter—and Tod—another spirit in the pre-mortal life—promise each other that, while on earth, they will somehow find each other and get married ("Circle of Our Love").

However, finding themselves on Earth and living a mortal life, no one remembers the promises they made before they were born. Julie finds herself desperately in love with Wally Kestler, who is now leaving to serve a two-year mission. Julie promises she'll wait for him ("Will I Wait For You?"). Jimmy is a typical confused teenager, influenced by peer pressure and rebellious against his parents. He finds himself in the company of other teenagers who are critical of his parents for having such a large family and advocate philosophies such as zero population growth and legalized abortion ("Zero Population"). Because of their influence, he becomes upset when he learns his parents are going to have another baby (Emily). Pam, Jimmy's twin sister, who has medical problems and can't walk, talks to Jimmy and tries to help him sort things out ("Line Upon Line"). Jimmy is still confused and leaves home to live with his friends. But when Jimmy has a chance encounter and conversation with a non-Mormon named Tod Richards ("Voices") and then gets a phone call from his family telling him Pam has died, he begins some serious personal reflection ("Brace Me Up"). He decides to return to his family.

Meanwhile, Julie gets engaged to another man, Peter, and writes a "Dear John letter" to Wally while he's still on his mission ("He's Just a Friend/Dear John"). Wally is devastated, but his companion, Elder Green, convinces him to "shape up" and keep preaching the Gospel ("Humble Way"). Though the two companions have not had much success proselyting, they find Tod, who has been searching for answers ("Paper Dream") and teach him by the Spirit. Julie decides she doesn't want to marry Peter after all, but when Wally comes home from his mission, he brings Tod with him, and Julie realizes he's the man she's been searching for all her life ("Feelings of Forever"). At the climax of the movie, Pam dies and meets Emily in Heaven. They joyously reunite, then say goodbye as Pam must ascend into the afterlife at the same time as Emily must descend from the pre-life into her new mortal body as she is born. The main title song, "Saturday's Warrior", is played as a finale.

Production history
Saturday's Warrior was first produced at BYU in the spring of 1974 with Stewart, de Azevedo, and Harold Oaks, of the BYU theatrical department, being the moving forces behind the production. Azevedo was only lightly involved with the BYU production but later in 1974 staged a production in Los Angeles that was billed as having the original cast.

A 1975 run in Salt Lake City and Spanish Fork, Utah was very successful.

Cast

 Erik Hickenlooper as Jimmy
 Cori Jacobsen as Julie
 Davison Cheney as Tod
 Bart Hickenlooper as Wally
 D.L. Walker as Harold Greene
 Marianne Thompson as Pam
 Marvin Payne as Dad
 Gay Parvis as Mom

 Mary Greenwood as Shelly
 Jared Christensen as Benjy
 Kelsi Osborn as Alice
 Matthew Lewis as Ernie
 Rebecca Tate as Emily
 Michelle Schaertl as Baby Emily
 Judy Hibbert as Matron
 Travis Tanner as Mack
 Judy Gubler as Angel

Musical numbers
Musical Numbers, as included in the original play soundtrack:

"Saturday's Warrior"
"Circle of Our Love"
"Pullin' Together"
"Humble Way"
"Sailing On"
"Will I Wait For You?"
"Daddy's Nose"

"Zero Population"
"Didn't We Love Him?"
"Line Upon Line"
"He's Just a Friend/Dear John"
"Humble Way Reprise" (FV)
"Paper Dream"
"Summer of Fair Weather"
"Saturday's Warrior Reprise" (SV)

"Voices" (SV)
"Brace Me Up"
"Brace Me Up Production Number"
"Paper Dream Reprise I"
"Paper Dream Reprise II" (FV)
"Feelings of Forever"
"Saturday's Warrior Finale"

(SV) Stage Version only(FV) Film Version only

Reception
Saturday's Warrior is not well known outside the LDS Church. The themes of Saturday's Warrior, however, resound with many church members, especially regarding "the last days".

The Los Angeles Times reviewer described the production as "pleasant lively and well-sung,... with an emphasis on close family ties."

2016 film
After resisting the idea for many years, de Azevedo and Stewart decided to make a film version of the musical, which opened in 2016.  The film is directed by Michael Buster, who co-wrote the script with Heather Ravarino.

de Azevedo wrote three new songs for the movie version.

Production
The force behind this production largely came from de Azevedo's daughters, Emilie and Rachel. It has been criticized as having very poor production quality. Others have felt it was a well-produced work that truly moved the stage production into the realm of film.

Cast

 Kenny Holland as Jimmy Flinders
 Jacob Buster as Ernie Flinders
 Monica Moore Smith as Julie Flinders
 Mason D. Davis as Tod Richards
 Bailee M. Johnson as Shelley Flinders
 Caroline Labrum as Alice Flinders
 Pete Day as Mr. Kestler
 Katie E. Curran as Flight Attendant
 Grace Hallows as Grace
 Carlton Bluford as Mack
 Chelsea Jurkiewicz as Bus Girl
 Alex Boyé as The Heavenly Guide
 Anna Daines as Pam Flinders
 Brian Clark as Adam Flinders
 Alison Akin Clark as Terri Flinders
 Morgan Gunter as Elder Greene
 Clint Pulver as Elder Kestler
 James Bounous as Peter

Cameo
 The Piano Guys

Crew

 Michael Buster (Director/Writer)
 Lex de Azevedo (Writer/Executive Producer/Producer)
 Heather Ravarino (Writer)
 Duane Andersen (Co-Producer)
 Emilie de Azevedo Brown (Executive Producer)
 Rachel Coleman (Executive Producer)
 Jarrod Phillips (Producer)
 Bonnie Story (Choreographer)

Soundtrack

See also
 Added Upon

References
Association for Mormon letters composite of articles on Saturday's Warrior

External links
 

1973 musicals
Latter Day Saint plays and pageants
Musicals based on religious traditions

1980s musical films
1989 films
Films shot in Utah
Mormon cinema
Films scored by Lex de Azevedo
1980s English-language films